The Hall Cycle and Plating company was a maker of Cycle cars in Waco, Texas from 1914-1915.

History 

In 1914, a man named John B. Fisher designed a cyclecar for the Hall Cycle and Plating Company. It had an underslung frame. Lawrence Hall, president of the company, did a test run from Waco to Dallas, covering 104 miles while consuming only 2.5 gallons of gasoline. The cyclecar had a 4-cylinder, 18 hp engine(the prototype only had a two-cylinder engine) with a 100" wheelbase. The company reorganized in 1915 as the Hall Motor car Company. Production ended in 1915, and Lawrence Hall moved to Los Angeles.

References 

Cyclecars
Defunct motor vehicle manufacturers of the United States
Manufacturing companies based in Texas
Companies based in Waco, Texas
Vehicle manufacturing companies established in 1914
Vehicle manufacturing companies disestablished in 1915
1914 establishments in Texas
1915 disestablishments in Texas
Defunct companies based in Texas